William Money Hardinge (1854-1916) was an English poet and author.

The son of Dr Henry Hardinge of London, William received his education at Westminster and Oxford. During his time at Balliol, he gained a reputation as a romantic
homosexual and aesthete, acquiring the nickname of the 'Balliol Bugger'. He had a controversial relationship with the essayist Walter Pater, for which he was sent down for nine months. In 1876, at the age of 21, he won the Newdigate Prize for his work Troy and recited his poem at the Sheldonian Theatre, June 21, 1876. In the 1880s he turned to writing novels with heterosexual
romantic themes.

Bibliography
 Out of the Fog (1888)
 The Willow-Garth (1886)
 Eugenia: an Episode (1883)
 Clifford Gray: A Romance of Modern Life (1881)
 Chrysanthema: Gathered from the Greek Anthology (1878)

References

1854 births
1916 deaths
English male poets
Alumni of Balliol College, Oxford
English LGBT poets
English LGBT novelists
English male novelists
English gay writers